Jackson-Milton High School is a public high school in Jackson Township, Ohio, United States.  It is the only high school in the Jackson-Milton Local School District. Sports teams are called the Blue Jays, and they compete in the Ohio High School Athletic Association as a member of the Mahoning Valley Athletic Conference.

References

External links
Jackson-Milton High School
Jackson-Milton Local School District

High schools in Mahoning County, Ohio
Public high schools in Ohio